Ansgar (801–865) was an Archbishop of Hamburg-Bremen.

Ansgar may also refer to:

People 
Ansgar (name), origin of the name and people named "Ansgar"

Places

Churches 
Ansgar Church, Germany
Ansgars Church, Denmark
Ansgar's Church, Sweden
St. Ansgar's Cathedral, Denmark
St. Ansgar's Church, Norway

Other places
St. Ansgar, Iowa, US
St. Ansgar Township, Mitchell County, Iowa, US

Other uses
Ansgar von Lahnstein, a character on the German soap opera Verbotene Liebe

See also 
Ansgarius (crater), lunar crater
Vita Ansgari, the biography of Ansgar, written by Rimbert, his successor as archbishop in Hamburg-Bremen

it:Ansgar